William Meredyth Somerville, 1st Baron Athlumney, 1st Baron Meredyth PC (1802 – 7 December 1873), known as Sir William Somerville, Bt, between 1831 and 1863, was an Anglo-Irish Liberal politician. He was born in 1802.

Background and education
Athlumney was the son of Sir Marcus Somerville, 4th Baronet of Somerville, in the County of Meath, and Mary Anne, daughter of Sir Richard Gorges-Meredyth, 1st Baronet. He was educated at Christ Church, Oxford.

Political career
Athlumney was returned to Parliament for Drogheda in 1837, a seat he held until 1852, and served under Lord John Russell as Under-Secretary of State for the Home Department from 1846 to 1847 and as Chief Secretary for Ireland from 1847 to 1852 during the worst of the Great Famine. In 1847 he was sworn of the Privy Council. He lost his seat in the 1852 general election, but was successfully returned for Canterbury in 1854, and continued to represent this constituency until 1865. In 1863 he was raised to the Peerage of Ireland as Baron Athlumney, of Somerville and Dollarstown in the County of Meath, and in 1866 he was further honoured when he was created Baron Meredyth, of Dollarstown in the County of Meath, in the Peerage of the United Kingdom. This second title commemorated his descent from the Meredyth family.

Family
Lord Athlumney married firstly Lady Maria Harriet, daughter of Henry Conyngham, 1st Marquess Conyngham, in 1832. They had one son (who died as an infant) and one daughter. After her death in December 1843 he married secondly Maria Georgiana Elizabeth, daughter of Herbert George Jones, in 1860. They had two sons (of whom the youngest died as a child). Lord Athlumney died in  Dover, Kent, in December 1873 and was succeeded by his eldest and only surviving son from his second marriage, James. Lady Athlumney died in January 1899, aged 67.

Arms

References

External links 
 

1802 births
1873 deaths
Barons in the Peerage of Ireland
Peers of Ireland created by Queen Victoria
1
William
Peers of the United Kingdom created by Queen Victoria
Liberal Party (UK) MPs for English constituencies
Members of the Parliament of the United Kingdom for County Louth constituencies (1801–1922)
UK MPs 1837–1841
UK MPs 1841–1847
UK MPs 1847–1852
UK MPs 1852–1857
UK MPs 1857–1859
UK MPs 1859–1865
UK MPs who were granted peerages
Politics of Canterbury
Members of the Privy Council of the United Kingdom
Members of the Privy Council of Ireland
Chief Secretaries for Ireland